Guzmania squarrosa is a plant species in the genus Guzmania. This species is native to Bolivia, Guyana, Colombia, Venezuela, Peru, and Ecuador.

Cultivars
 Guzmania 'Denise'
 Guzmania 'Rachel'

References

squarrosa
Flora of South America
Plants described in 1904